Karl August Friedrich of Waldeck and Pyrmont (24 September 1704 – 29 August 1763) was Prince of Waldeck and Pyrmont and Commander of the Dutch forces in the War of Austrian Succession.

Royal life and military career
Karl was the second son of Friedrich Anton Ulrich, Prince of Waldeck and Pyrmont and Countess Palatine Louise of Zweibrücken-Birkenfeld, youngest child of Christian II, Count Palatine of Zweibrücken-Birkenfeld. In 1728 his father and his elder brother Christian Philip died, and so he became Prince of Waldeck and Pyrmont.

The Waldecks had a tradition of military service in the Dutch Army. Prince Georg Friedrich of Waldeck had already led the Dutch army in the War of the Grand Alliance. In the War of Austrian Succession, Karl was appointed as commander of the Dutch Army by the States-General of the Netherlands, as counterbalance to William IV, Prince of Orange, who relied completely on his brother-in-law the Duke of Cumberland. The Dutch army under Waldeck's command was defeated in the Battle of Fontenoy, the Battle of Rocoux and the Battle of Lauffeld. In 1746, Karl became Fieldmarshal of the Holy Roman Empire.

Marriage and children
In Zweibrücken, on 19 August 1741, Karl August married his first cousin Countess Palatine Christiane Henriette of Zweibrücken-Birkenfeld (1725–1816), daughter of Christian III, Count Palatine of Zweibrücken. 

The couple had seven children:
Prince Charles of Waldeck and Pyrmont (1742–1756)
Friedrich Karl August, Prince of Waldeck and Pyrmont (1743–1812)
Christian August, Prince of Waldeck and Pyrmont (1744–1798), a Field Marshal in the Portuguese army
George I, Prince of Waldeck and Pyrmont (1747–1813); married Princess Augusta of Schwarzburg-Sondershausen
Princess Caroline of Waldeck and Pyrmont (1748–1782), married Peter von Biron, last Duke of Courland and Semigallia
Princess Luise of Waldeck and Pyrmont (1751–1816), married Frederick Augustus, Duke of Nassau
Prince Louis of Waldeck and Pyrmont (1752–1793), killed in action near Kortrijk

Ancestry

References
 

1704 births
1763 deaths
People from Hanau
Dutch generals
German princes
Princes of Waldeck and Pyrmont
Field marshals of Austria
Dutch military personnel of the War of the Austrian Succession
House of Waldeck and Pyrmont
Generals of the Holy Roman Empire
18th-century Dutch military personnel